Rosario Luchetti (born 4 June 1984) is an Argentine field hockey player, who won the bronze medal at the 2008 Summer Olympics in Beijing and the silver medal at the 2012 Olympic Games in London with the Argentina national women's hockey team.

Charito, as she is known, emerged from the youths of the Belgrano Athletic Club and debuted in Las Leonas (Argentina national field hockey team) at the 2005 Champions Trophy. In the course of her career, she won medals at major tournaments of international field hockey, such as the bronze medal at the 2008 Olympic Games in Beijing, the silver medal at the 2012 Olympic Games in London, the 2010 World Cup in Rosario, Argentina, the gold medal at the 2006 ODESUR Games and 2007 Pan American Games, five Champions Trophy and two Pan American Cups, among others.

References
 
 Confederación Argentina de Hockey (Official site of the Argentine Hockey Confederation)

External links
 
 
 

1984 births
Living people
Argentine female field hockey players
Field hockey players from Buenos Aires
Olympic field hockey players of Argentina
Field hockey players at the 2007 Pan American Games
Field hockey players at the 2008 Summer Olympics
Field hockey players at the 2011 Pan American Games
Olympic bronze medalists for Argentina
Las Leonas players
Olympic medalists in field hockey
Olympic silver medalists for Argentina
Field hockey players at the 2012 Summer Olympics
Argentine people of Italian descent
Medalists at the 2012 Summer Olympics
Medalists at the 2008 Summer Olympics
Pan American Games gold medalists for Argentina
Pan American Games silver medalists for Argentina
Pan American Games medalists in field hockey
South American Games gold medalists for Argentina
South American Games medalists in field hockey
Competitors at the 2006 South American Games
Field hockey players at the 2019 Pan American Games
Medalists at the 2007 Pan American Games
Medalists at the 2011 Pan American Games
Medalists at the 2019 Pan American Games
21st-century Argentine women